Gogol is a fantasy-horror films TV-series directed by Egor Baranov and produced by the Sreda production company. It is loosely based on works by Nikolai Gogol from the collection Evenings on a Farm near Dikanka. The title role is played by Alexander Petrov. Six episodes of the series had theatrical premieres as compilation films.

 Gogol. The Beginning is the first of three films of the project Gogol and the first Russian television series to have a theatrical release. It was released on August 31, 2017. It earned  $7,757,988 at the box-office.
 Gogol. Viy was released on April 5, 2018, The box-office gross was $8 011 641.
 Gogol. Terrible Revenge was released on August 30, 2018.

The serial was shown on the TV channel TV-3 with two new episodes that didn't have a theatrical release.

Films
 Gogol. The Beginning (2017)
 Chapter One. Murders in Dikanka
 Chapter Two. The Red Scroll
 Gogol. Viy (2018)
 Chapter Three. Enchanted place
 Dead Souls (2019)
 The well of blood (2019)
Chapter Four. Viy
 Gogol. Terrible Revenge (2018)
 Chapter five. Rider's Lair
 Chapter six. Terrible Vengeance

References 

Films based on works by Nikolai Gogol
Russian horror films
Russian fantasy films
2010s fantasy films
Television series by Sreda
Russian horror fiction television series
2019 Russian television series debuts
2019 Russian television series endings